1952 in Korea may refer to:
1952 in North Korea
1952 in South Korea